Calrose is a medium grain rice variety, notable for being the founding variety of the California rice industry.

History
Calrose (USDA # C.I. 8988) originated from and was developed at the Rice Experiment Station near Biggs, California, and released to California growers in 1948. It grew in popularity with growers, marketers, and consumers to become the prominent rice variety in California until the late 1970s. Specific processing and cooking properties were associated with Calrose. 

Over the years, improved new varieties of Calrose grain cooking and processing characteristics were released. These medium-sized grains were commingled with Calrose in storage, and later replaced the variety in commercial production, due to their superior performance at many levels. Although that variety of Calrose is no longer grown, Calrose has become a name recognized both in trade and the marketplace for the California-type, medium-grain rice. The name "rose" indicates its medium-grain shape ("Blue Rose" is an earlier medium-grain developed in Louisiana), and "Cal" pays homage to California, the state of the grain’s origin and production. Eighty percent of the California rice crop is Calrose rice.

Availability 
Calrose rice is the most recognized variety of California rice in the United States and abroad, especially in the Pacific. The variety is grown in other areas of the world where growing conditions are suitable, such as Australia.

After cooking, Calrose rice grains hold flavor well, and are soft and stick together, making it good for use in sushi.

Calrose was once a much sought-after variety in Korea, where it was considered exotic. There was even a black market for the variety, and it was smuggled in large quantities.

Growers 
The following are the top suppliers of Calrose Rice:

 California Family Foods
 American Commodity Company
 Farmers' Rice Cooperative
 Pacific International Rice Mills
 Doguet's Rice Milling Company
 Far West Rice
 Hinode Rice
 Sun Valley Rice

References

External links
 California Rice Commission

Agriculture in California
Japonica rice
Rice production in the United States